The Robaia is a right tributary of the river Vâlsan in Romania. It flows into the Vâlsan in the village Robaia.

References

Rivers of Romania
Rivers of Argeș County